Paul Merton: The Series is a British sketch show that aired on Channel 4 from 1991 to 1993. The main star was Paul Merton, who co-wrote it along with John Irwin. It is available on DVD and every episode is available for viewing free via Channel 4 service All4.  It can also be purchased in the UK via iTunes.

Cast
Paul Merton - Various
John Irwin - Various
Robert Harley - Various

Merton, Irwin and Harley were the main cast, however, each episode featured guest stars including Siobhan Hayes, Chris Lang, Ben Miller, Neil Mullarkey and Caroline Quentin, who was Merton's wife at the time.

Broadcast details
Series one was broadcast between 25 September 1991 and 30 October 1991. Series two was broadcast between 3 September 1993 and 8 October 1993. Each episode in the first series was 30 minutes long, including adverts, while the second series episodes were 35 minutes including adverts.

Both series were produced by David Tyler

References

External links 
 

1991 British television series debuts
1993 British television series endings
1990s British television sketch shows
Television series by Hat Trick Productions
Channel 4 sketch shows
English-language television shows